Bits of What I Have is a Bahraini movie shot in Turkey, The film is produced by Ibrahem AlRabeh and Zeeshan Jawed Shah, and is written and directed by Saleh Sharif. The film is about two days in the life of an ageing writer who is in the brink of extinction and a youthful soul who is in utter need of inspiration and happens to seek it in the arms of an anguished writer.

Synopsis 

The two days in the life of an aging writer who is in the brink of extinction and a youthful soul who is in utter need of inspiration and happens to seek it in the arms of an anguished writer.
The old man is a well-known and celebrated writer of his generation, but since the death of his wife and his daughter he has not been able to complete his book due to the bitterness, which he has also developed over the years for the world and the people which inherit it. The book that he is working on is said to be a masterpiece like his earlier work or perhaps even of a much higher caliber. The old man has not left his house for a long time now and refuses to take part in any humanly activities. He has closed himself behind his four shabby walls and there he performs acts of vandalism within his closed closet.
 
Though the world must have forgotten him and his words, there still resides a young man who has found bliss in his company but due to certain circumstances has not been able to visit the writer for about two weeks now.
 
The young man happens to be a teacher in a school teaching children English literature and tries to inspire his students with inadequate or rather grim methods. He is married to a young woman who tries to keep him happy with what she knows of happiness.
 
The young couple is expecting their first child and instead of getting closer they move further apart from each other.  Their relationship is tested when the young man starts to see the world from the old man’s gloomy perceptive and starts to question his place in society and in this world.
 
As the old man and the young man argue and question their place in society, they find out that they both aren't that further apart from each other. Though they have lived in a different time and era but their outlook towards the decaying world and humanity remains the same.
 
The meaning of existence and one’s right to their own free will are reflected in the film. And the question that “is one truly the master of his own craft?” is touched during the course of the film.

Cast 

Bahadır Elmas as Young Teacher
Mustafa Akyıldız as Old Writer
Yudum Yelda Akyıldız as Young Teacher's Wife
Mehmet Kutlukan as Young Teacher's Father in Law
Semra Engin as Young Teacher's Mother in Law
Mehmet Senyer as Young Teacher's in Laws
Erdi Kabakuşak as Young Teacher's in Laws
Güleycan Düzgün as Young Teacher's in Laws

Crew 

Saleh Shairf Director & Writer
Ibrahem AlRabeh Producer
Zeeshan Jawed Shah Co-Producer
Nurcan Bektas  script translator
Zahid Balooshi, Nurcan Bektas, and Saleh Shairf Associate Producers
Emrah Karakurum Cinematographer
Diren Can Oztemel Editor
Güleycan Düzgün and Erdi Kabakusak Production Designer
Erdi Kabakusak Art Director
Güleycan Düzgün Costume Designer
Zahid Balooshi Assistant Director
Ekrem Ekici Camera Assistant
Mertkan Kaya Steadi-Cam Operator
Diren Can Oztemel Focus Puller

References

External links 
 
 

2015 films
Bahraini drama films
Turkish drama films
Films set in Turkey
Films shot in Turkey
Articles containing video clips